Alexander Adolf August Karl von Linsingen  (10 February 1850 – 5 June 1935) was a German general during World War I.

Military service
Linsingen joined the Prussian Army in 1868 and rose to Corps Commander (II Corps) in 1909. He was one of the very few top German generals not to have served on the general staff.

At the beginning of World War I, Linsingen was a Corps commander in the First Battle of the Marne. Transferred to the Eastern Front where German and Austrian armies were threatened by a Russian offensive in Galicia, Linsingen took command of South Army (1915). He defeated the Russian armies in the Battle of Stryi in 1915, capturing 60,000 Russian prisoners. He was awarded the Pour le Mérite on 14 May 1915 and the Oakleaves (for a second award) on 3 July 1915.

In 1915, he took command of the Army of the Bug and was concurrently commander of Heeresgruppe Linsingen.  In June 1916, his Army Group faced the Brusilov offensive. After an initial retreat, he checked the Russian advance at the Battle of Kowel. He was promoted to Colonel-General, the second highest rank for a general in the Imperial German Army (4 stars). In 1917-1918 and especially after the signing of the Treaty of Brest-Litovsk, he led the German advance into the Ukraine.
 
On 31 March 1918, his Army Group was disbanded and von Linsingen became the Military Governor of Berlin (June 1918). Alexander von Linsingen died on 5 June 1935 and is interred at the Neuen St. Nikolai-Friedhof in Hannover, Germany.

Decorations and awards
 Iron Cross of 1870, 2nd class
 Order of the Crown, 2nd class with Star (Prussia)
 Knight of Justice of the Order of Saint John (Bailiwick of Brandenburg)
 Service Award (Prussia)
 Commander 2nd Class of the Order of Albert the Bear (Anhalt)
 Knight's Cross 2nd Class of the Order of the Zähringer Lion with Oak Leaves (Baden)
 Military Merit Order, 2nd class with Star (Bavaria)
 Grand Cross with Gold Crown in the House Order of the Wendish Crown (Mecklenburg)
 Grand Commanders Cross of the Order of the Griffon (Mecklenburg)
 Grand Cross of the Friedrich Order
 Commander Grand Cross of the Order of the Sword (1911)
 Iron Cross of 1914, 1st class
 Grand Cross of the Royal Hungarian Order of Saint Stephen (1915)
 Pour le Mérite (14 May 1915); Oak Leaves added on 3 July 1915
 Order of the Black Eagle (27 January 1917)
 Grand Cross of the Order of the Red Eagle with Swords (27 January 1917)

Glossary
Armee-Abteilung or Army Detachment in the sense of "something detached from an Army".  It is not under the command of an Army so is in itself a small Army.
Armee-Gruppe or Army Group in the sense of a group within an Army and under its command, generally formed as a temporary measure for a specific task.
Heeresgruppe or Army Group in the sense of a number of armies under a single commander.

References

Bibliography

External links

 

1850 births
1935 deaths
People from Hildesheim
People from the Kingdom of Hanover
German Army generals of World War I
German military personnel of the Franco-Prussian War
Colonel generals of Prussia
Recipients of the Pour le Mérite (military class)
Recipients of the Iron Cross (1870), 2nd class
Commanders Grand Cross of the Order of the Sword
Recipients of the Iron Cross (1914), 1st class
Recipients of the Military Merit Order (Bavaria)
Grand Crosses of the Order of Saint Stephen of Hungary
19th-century Prussian military personnel
Military personnel from Lower Saxony